Lentibacillus lipolyticus is a Gram-positive, aerobic, spore-forming and moderately halophilic bacterium from the genus of Lentibacillus which has been isolated from shrimp paste from the Samut Sakhon province.

References

Bacillaceae
Bacteria described in 2019